Emery Hicks  (born August 10, 1947) was an American and Canadian football player who played for the Winnipeg Blue Bombers, and Hamilton Tiger-Cats. He won the Grey Cup with Hamilton in 1972. He played college football at the University of Kansas.

References

1947 births
Living people
Winnipeg Blue Bombers players
Hamilton Tiger-Cats players
Memphis Southmen players
San Antonio Wings players
Canadian football linebackers
American football linebackers
Kansas Jayhawks football players
American players of Canadian football
Players of American football from Oklahoma